Horaiclavus kilburni is a species of sea snail, a marine gastropod mollusc in the family Horaiclavidae.

Description

Distribution
This marine species occurs off the Province of the Eastern Cape, South Africa.

References

 Stahlschmidt P. (2015). Description of three new turrid species (Gastropoda: Conoidea) from South Africa. Miscellanea Malacologica. 7(1): 13–18

Endemic fauna of South Africa
kilburni
Gastropods described in 2015